Lee Young-hoon (March 6, 1960 – February 14, 2008) was a South Korean composer best known for the ballads he wrote for singer Lee Moon-sae in the 1980s and 1990s. In the 21st century, his songs have been covered by popular K-pop acts, and were used in the jukebox musical Gwanghwamun Love Song.

Career 

Lee Young-Hoon's career as a composer mostly focused on theatre, mainstream media and dance music. After he was introduced to musician and songwriter Lee Moon-sae from Um-inho, he began to compose for the singer. After the success of these songs, Lee Young-Hoon began exploring the 'Pop Ballads' genre. In 1987, Lee Young-Hoon won the Golden Disc Award and the Best Composer Award for "When Love is Gone," "Break Up Story" and "Only the Sound of Her Laughter."

Lee Moon-sae's third collection became a hit selling more than 1,500,000 copies. Lee Moon-sae's fourth collection sold 2,850,000 copies. Lee Moon-sae's fifth album had several thousand pre-orders before it was released, and it brought Lee Moon-sae three Golden Disc Awards. Lee Young-Hoon songs changed people’s perspectives on popular music. These songs became popular among teenagers. His work was credited as playing a significant role in the growth in popularity of the genre. He released eight more albums and three special albums with Lee Moon-sae through 2001.

Death 
Lee Young-Hoon was diagnosed with colorectal cancer. Despite his health condition, he continued to compose songs. During this stage, he wrote Old love1·2 and produced the musical Gwanghwamun love song. He died on February 14, 2008, at age 49.

Discography

Props album 
Lee Young-Hoon completed the album A Short Piece in 1992 with orchestra musicians from Russia's Bolshoi Theater. The album consists of songs he wrote in his 20s and 30s. The feeling is "wintery", as the songs were based on cold times such as during a snowy winter in Moscow. Its words derive from the prologue of 'Small Pieces, When Love is Gone'.

Lee Young-Hoon composed seven albums in collaboration with singer Lee Moon-se, then moved to Russia and released his Small Pieces album with the Bolshoi orchestra. The first album, featuring "Sorrow String Melody" was released in 1993. He released his second album with the Bolshoi orchestra one year after the first. This album consisted of orchestral arrangements of his previous hit songs. He submitted the work to the largest music exhibition in the world, MIDEM in Cannes. He later released a third album, marking the end of his collaboration with the orchestra. Gun Hee Park, who opened the first internet exhibition in South Korea, designed the album ‘Small Pieces’ and provided his support. Gun Hee Park also experimental thoughts about melody as often and as much to his ability.

Awards 
He received the grand prize of Golden Disc Award in 1987. He received Golden Disc Awards for three consecutive years from 1986.

Legacy 
Before 1980, Korea had no pop music genre. People usually listened to Teuroteu or American songs. However, Lee Young-Hoon and Lee Moon-se created this new genre. As Lee Young-Hoon came up with poetic lyrics, launching the Korean ‘pop ballad’.

In 2000, retro culture started a trend of re-making music, and Lee Young-Hoon’s songs were heavily featured. In 2008 the first album with all re-make songs of Lee Young-Hoon appeared.

Recently, Big Bang, IU, Oh-hyuk covered Lee Young-Hoon’s songs.

The leading music critic in Korea, Lim Jin-mo said, “Lee Young-Hoon’s classic based melody and poetic lyrics improved the dignity of Korean pop music”.

References 

2008 deaths
South Korean composers